Countess of Devonshire may refer to:

Penelope Blount, Countess of Devonshire (1563–1607)
Elizabeth Cavendish, Countess of Devonshire (1619–1689)
Christian Cavendish, Countess of Devonshire (died 1675)